The Trans-Pennine Cup was a short-lived competition for professional British rugby league clubs in the RFL Second Division.

The competition had no qualification rounds; only a final was played. The finalists were the highest placed team in the Northern Ford Premiership from either side of the Pennines (Yorkshire versus Lancashire/Cumbria), at an early stage of the season. 

In 2001 the competition was replaced by the Championship Cup, a longer and more structured competition.

Winners

See also
 National League Cup

References

Rugby league competitions in the United Kingdom